The seventh series of British drama series Bad Girls premiered on ITV on 10 May 2005. The series concluded on 19 December 2005 with a Christmas Special. Series Seven consists of thirteen episodes. 

This series sees the departure of several of its regular cast, including Tristan Sturrock, Philip McGough, Tracey Wilkinson, and Jack Ellis. The sixth series was intended to be Ellis' last, however he agreed to return for one last series. It also marks the final series for James Gaddas as a regular cast member, as he returned at the beginning of the eighth series in a guest role.

The seventh series also sees the introduction of Nicola Stapleton (Janine Nebeski), Rebecca Hazlewood (Arun Palmer), Liz May Brice (Pat Kerrigan), Laura Rogers (Sheena Williams), Andrew Scarborough (Kevin Spiers) and Ellie Haddington (Joy Masterton) respectively.

Cast

Main

 Jack Ellis as Jim Fenner
 Tracey Wilkinson as Di Barker
 Helen Fraser as Sylvia Hollamby
 Tristan Sturrock as Colin Hedges
 Liz May Brice as Pat Kerrigan
 Dannielle Brent as Natalie Buxton
 Antonia Okonma as Darlene Cake
 Victoria Bush as Tina O'Kane
 James Gaddas as Neil Grayling 
 Stephanie Beacham as Phyl Oswyn
 Amanda Barrie as Bev Tull 
 Nicola Stapleton as Janine Nabeski 
 Rebecca Hazlewood as Arun Palmer
 Laura Rogers as Sheena Williams
 Andrew Scarborough as Kevin Spiers
 Victoria Alcock as Julie Saunders
 Kika Mirylees as Julie Johnston
 Philip McGough as Malcolm Nicholson
 Ellie Haddington as Joy Masterton

Recurring and guest cast
Recurring cast:

 Colette O'Neil - Sister Thomas Moore
 Gaynor Howe as Christy Mackay
 Francesca Fowler as Laura Canning
 Nicola Redmond as Miranda Miles
 Paul Henry as Frank
 Joanna Brookes as Denise
 Louis Waymouth as Bobby Darren Hollamby
 Richard Mylan as Benjamin Phillips
 Orlessa Altass as Vicky Floyd

Guest cast:

 Frank McCusker as Miller
 Jude Akuwudike as Leroy
 Christine Furness as Waitress
 Jonnie Hum as Andy
 Dave Hill as Ron
 Claire-Louise Cordwell as Shop assistant
 Mika Simmons as Blonde detective
 Daniel Hill as Dr. Nelson
 Nicky Henson as Hugo
 Jaimi Barbakoff as Sales assistant
 Ashlie Walker as Emily Canning
 Terence Harvey as Derek
 John Cater as Solicitor
 Pauline Whittaker as Principal Officer
 James Ellis as Father Kelly
 Malcolm Scales as Bob Webster
 Angela McHale as Nurse
 Richard Gaisford as Reporter
 Ross O'Hennessy as Security agent
 Romolo Bruni as Paco
 Rad Lazar as Mikhail
 Robert Cambrinus as Sergei
 Emma Jerrold as Collette
 Robyn Burry as Jen
 Lucy Alexander as Newsreader
 Sudha Bhuchar as Magistrate
 Jonathon Finley as Clerk of the Court
 David Gwillim as Mr. Fergus
 Orlando Vitorini as Spanish clerk
 Teddy Kempner as Jeweller
 Tony Slattery as DI Alan Hayes
 Lucy O'Connell as DS Caroline Hook
 Clara Salaman as Pathologist
 Ravi Kothakota as Constable
 Graham Christopher as Court Clerk
 Antony Gabriel as Prosecution Lawyer
 Patrick Pearson as Mr. Davis
 Karen Meagher as Magistrate
 Alby Jones as Mark
 Phillip Lester as Clive
 Aoife McMahon as Frankie
 Daniella Dessa as Iga Lukasiak
 Seeta Indrani as Consultant
 Alastair Southey as Brendan
 Elizabeth Banks as Journalist
 Candida Gubbins as Dr. Henderson
 Michael Fish as himself

Storylines
The series picks up several weeks following the revelation that Fenner had framed Karen Betts in the hit-and-run. Fenner, now convicted for his crime, is struggling to come to terms with his new surroundings and is targeted by the other prisoners as they know that he is an ex-screw. Following an attack in the shower block, Fenner requests to be moved to segregation for his protection. Meanwhile at Larkhall, It is revealed that Frances Myers has become the new governing governor of Whitehouse Prison; Neil announces that he will be taking on full responsibility of G-wing as they are short staffed and offers Colin the position of senior office in Fenner's absence. Tina, having been recently released, finds it difficult to adjust to life on the outside, and is upset that Ben was not waiting for her and that she is not pregnant; she makes a desperate attempt to be sent back to Larkhall and successfully gets whats she wants after setting fire to a clothes shop. The Two Julies are eager to make contact with Tina and are told by Ben that Tina wants nothing to do with her past and subsequently discover that he is having an affair with Buxton. Neil, with the help of the Julies, make the discovery that Ben works in different jobs under two different names within the prison and upon finding Ben with Natalie, Ben is arrested and placed in the same prison as Fenner. Fenner sees this an opportunity to frame Ben for his crime. Two new prisoners, Janine Nabeski and Arun Parmar arrive on G-wing and Janine is determined to make Arun suffer for confessing their crimes in court. Fenner, having revealed to Di that he did, in fact steal Karen's car on the night of the hit-and-run tries to convince her that he loves her and wants to start a family. Di, in two minds, decides to help him and they frame Ben for Fenner's crime. Fenner is eventually released and reinstated as G-wing governor. Now that Fenner has become governor, he sets new ground rules for the inmates. Natalie, having intimidated the other women, now holds the position of top dog and has set her own rules. With the help of Darlene, Natalie forces the other inmates to pay tax by handing all their possessions over to her in order to receive her 'protection'. Janine, in fear, is keen to get on Natalie's good side after Natalie stabs her in the eye with a pin. As Fenner and Natalie's illicit affair continues, he moves her up to enhanced and gives her a job in the library in order to keep her sweet so that she doesn't reveal their affair to Di. However, Di and Natalie soon come to blows when Di becomes suspicious. Sylvia receives some good news when she discovers that her recently deceased Aunt Margaret has left her a house and a large sum of money which gives Malcolm the perfect opportunity to get his hands on it by proposing to her. When Sylvia becomes aware that in order to receive the money, she must stay single, she finds it difficult to reveal the news to Malcolm. 

When new prisoner, Laura Canning arrives G-wing, she is met with hatred by the other inmates as she has been convicted of stabbing her mother 27 times to death, while the whereabouts of her older sister are unknown. Colin tries to understand why Laura has committed the crime and it is revealed that Laura was bullied by both her sister and mother. Colin finally gets Laura to open up about her sisters whereabouts. Laura's sister is found alive and Laura commits suicide. An elderly nun, Sister Thomas arrives on G-wing convicted of fraud. While trying to convince everyone that she did not intend to keep the stolen charity money for herself, she does win the hearts of the other inmates, except Natalie, who attacks her. The women become convinced that they have found God through Sister Thomas and together they work on completing a charity blanket which is to be donated to The Little Sisters of The Poor to raise money for aids victims in Africa. Arun reveals to Sister Thomas that she used to be a man when Arun's visitor is caught trying to smuggle in hormone medication and she is put on cellular confinement when she refused to divulge what the medication is. When new prisoner, Pat Kerrigan, convicted of murdering her abusive boyfriend, arrives at Larkhall, she takes Sister Thomas hostage. And it is soon revealed that Sister Thomas used to work at a home for young girls, including Pat and her friend, Lucy and that they were abused by Sister Thomas and a priest, Father Kelly. When Father Kelly is forced to go to Larkhall, the truth comes out that they are both guilty. While Pat becomes a hero to the victims who suffered at the hands of Sister Thomas and Father Kelly, she makes several friends when she is met with a warm reception from the other inmates once she has returned from cellular confinement. When it is discovered by the women that Arun was once a man, Neil takes it into consideration whether or not to send her to a man's prison with protests from the inmates. While the women continue to bully Arun, Pat threatens Natalie to back off and the pair get into a brutal fight. When Pat beats Natalie down, not only does Arun get to remain at Larkhall, Pat becomes top dog in the process.

Episodes

Reception

Ratings

Awards and nominations
 Inside Soap Awards – Best Drama (Won)
 National Television Awards – Most Popular Drama (Nomination)

Home media

United Kingdom
 "Series Seven" – 7 August 2006 (4-DVD set distributed by 2 Entertain)  
 "The Complete Series Seven" re-release – 20 February 2012 (3-DVD set distributed by Acorn Media) 
 As part of "The Complete Collection" – 2 July 2012 (28-DVD set distributed by Acorn Media)

Australia
 "Series Seven" – 18 September 2006 (4-DVD set distributed by Shock Records)
 As part of "The Complete Collection" – 10 November 2010 (32-DVD set distributed by Shock Records)  
 "Series Seven" re-release (individual from "The Complete Collection") – 11 May 2011 (3-DVD set distributed by Shock Records)

References

External links
 
 Bad Girls Season 7 at the Internet Movie Database  

07
2005 British television seasons